Beniamin is a village in the Akhuryan Municipality of the Shirak Province of Armenia. The town was renamed in 1945 in honor of Beniamin Galstian, a World War II general and native of the town. According to Ghevont Alishan, the old name of the village is "Chlofkhan or Chalovkhan", and was founded in 1828-1830 in the territory of the historical city of Draskhanakert. The Statistical Committee of Armenia reported its population was 745 in 2010, up from 702 at the 2001 census.

Demographics

Historical and cultural structures 
"Tukh Manuk" chapel and Zham church are located in Beniamin.

Education 
There is a school in the village, where, in addition to the school curriculum, children are involved in extracurricular programs: art and craft groups, debate club, healthy lifestyle seminars.

With the efforts of the Children of Armenia Fund, trainings are being carried out for local medical workers.

Gallery

References 

Communities in Shirak Province
Populated places in Shirak Province